Basic Latin alphabet may refer to:
 Classical Latin alphabet
 ISO basic Latin alphabet, a codified standard for a 26-letter alphabet